The Peugeot DMA was a light truck built by Peugeot between 1941 and 1948. It was the first commercial vehicle from Peugeot to employ a forward control cab, whereby the driver sat right at the front of the vehicle. The configuration maximised load deck length and gave the driver a good view of the road, but it meant that the driver shared his cab with the engine:  Peugeot's light truck, being a rear wheel drive vehicle, was unable to offer a large low flat load area as the front-wheel drive Citroën TUB light van.

During the DMA's early years France was under German occupation, Peugeot's own plant being located in the strip of land known as the "Zone interdite" with the Swiss frontier to the east and occupied northern France to the west.  Many of the 11,045 DMA trucks produced were used by the German army. However, in the immediate postwar years, with funds for new models desperately restricted, the trucks continued to be produced for use by French operators such as local fire services.

The 2,142 cc petrol engine came from the Peugeot 402 and could be adapted to work using charcoal derived gazogène, applying technology in which Peugeot had developed an expertise in the late 1930s as the prospect of war, with its accompanying shortages of petrol/gasoline for non-military use, loomed.

There was also, from September 1946, a DMAH version, which featured hydraulic brake linkages.

The DMA was replaced in 1948 by the not dissimilar but smaller short-lived Peugeot Q3A light truck. Two years later the light commercial slot was filled by a van, the Peugeot D3 which by then already featured a Peugeot engine and which entered the Peugeot range in 1950 with the acquisition of the cash strapped Chenard-Walcker business.

External links 
 Dma/Dmah in French http://dma.peugeot.free.fr

References

DMA
Vehicles introduced in 1941